Double drumming (sometimes referred to as double drums) is a musical technique, used mostly in rock music, where two drummers each play a drum kit at the same time. One may play the rhythm while the other may play another style, or both may play the same rhythm. It is more common to have a main drummer with an auxiliary percussionist who plays Latin American percussion, toms, or mallet percussion, but this is not considered "double drumming".

Featuring two drummers has been common in jazz music, in particular in free jazz.

List of bands including double drumming/additional percussionists 

 
 38 Special (two drummers: 1974-87)
 ...And You Will Know Us by the Trail of Dead
 ABBA (two drummers during their 1977 Australian Tour)
 About Tess
 Adam and the Ants 1980–1982.(Also for Adam Ant solo live shows 1982–1984, 1995, 2010, 2011–present)
 Add N to (X)
 The Allman Brothers Band (two drummers 1968–82 and 1989–91; two drummers and percussionist from 1991–2014)
 Angels of Light
 Apollo 440 (Stop the Rock)
 Arcade Fire
 The Arcs
 The Band (occasionally after 1983 reformation)
 Big Pig
 Black Eyes
 Bleachers
 Bloc Party
 Blues Image (1966–1970)
 Bon Iver
 Brand New, 2014 tour
 Bright Eyes
 James Brown (intermittently, especially ca. 1966–76)
 Butthole Surfers, 1983–1985, 1986–1989, 2009
 Clear Light
 Phil Collins (Chester Thompson, touring)
 John Coltrane, on Meditations (1966)
 Combichrist (additional percussionist)
 Concussion Ensemble (three regular drumkits, plus junk percussion)
 Course of Empire
 Crash Worship
 Cult of Luna
 Dananananaykroyd
 Danielson
 Dead & Company
 Demetrius Williams and Malachi Burgess, double drummers for DPB Band and with Brian Haas of JFJO and others
 The Dirtbombs
 Do Make Say Think
 The Doobie Brothers
 Eagles of Death Metal
 Los Fabulosos Cadillacs (2015-Present)
 The Fall, 1981–1984, 1993–1997 (occasional), 2014–2016
 The Feelies
 Foreigner
 Frank Zappa and The Mothers Of Invention (two drummers: 1966-69; drummer and percussionist: on and off from 1973–88; two drummers and percussionist: 1973-74)
 Fugazi (early 2000s shortly before breakup)
 Genesis (1976–1993, 2007; Bill Bruford and then Chester Thompson, touring)
 The Glitter Band
 Godsmack (occasionally)
 Godspeed You! Black Emperor
 Gorillaz (2010, 2017–present)
 The Go! Team
 Grateful Dead (two drummers: 1967–1971, 1974–1995)
 Ground Zero (most but not all lineups)
 Hawkwind (1974–1976; occasionally thereafter)
 Henry Threadgill Sextett (1982–1989)
 Hidden Orchestra
 Hollywood Undead (an additional percussionist who plays on a kit that consists of both electronic and acoustic drums)
 Ill Niño (additional Latin percussion, consisting of bongos etc., including regular cymbals and drums)
 Incubus
 Indigo jam unit
 Joe Bonamassa
 Joe Walsh
 Journey (in 2021 tour)
 Jukin' Bone
 Kamasi Washington
 King Crimson (drummer and percussionist: 1972–1973; two drummers: 1994–1997 and 2008; 3 drummers since 2013)
 King Gizzard & the Lizard Wizard (2013-2020)
 Koinonia (two players, each with drumsets and aux percussion and varied usage) 
 Kylesa
 Levon Helm (during the 1980s)
 Little Richard (1997–2013)
 Live (during 2017-2019 live tours)
 Joe Lovano's Us Five band, ca. 2009–2012
 Marmaduke Duke
 The Melvins (2006-2015)
 Ministry (during tours 1989–1990)
 Modest Mouse (2004–12)
 The Moody Blues (additional touring drummer: 1991–Present)
 Morphine (two drummers: 1998-99)
 Motograter (additional. "Smur drums" consisting of steel barrel drums with drum heads) 
 Murder, Inc.
 Mushroomhead  (main drums + 2 water drumkits [live only], since 2006)
 The National (2019 tour)
 Neoton (acoustic+electronic)
 Needtobreathe
 N.E.R.D. (2007, 2008-2011, one show in 2018)
 Nick Cave and the Bad Seeds (since 1994, on most but not all recordings and performances)
 Nomeansno, 1993–1997
 Nothing More (singer Jonny Hawkins performs a solo on a custom kit consisting of a vertical bass drum, a snare drum and a makeshift hi-hat, while the actual drummer repeats simple beats)
 Oomph! (addt. electronic percussion + acoustic backup percussion on live shows)
 Ornette Coleman, first with his album Free Jazz: A Collective Improvisation an early and seminal example of double drumming; and occasionally thereafter
 The Outlaws (David Dix and Monty Yoho)
 OSEES
 The Party Boys
 Pavement
 Pink Fairies 1970-1971, 1973, 1975
 Pink Floyd (1980–1994; touring)
 Poliça
 Queen + Adam Lambert (2017 tour)
 Radiohead (In live performances since 2011)
 Ringo Starr & His All-Starr Band
 Rialto
 Robyn (2007 & 2008 live performances while supporting album, "Robyn") 
 Rock Hot Chicks 
 Rod Stewart (2017 and 2018 tour)
 The Roots
 Sabaton (only on their Wacken 2019 performance for their 20-year anniversary)
 Shout Out Out Out Out
 Showaddywaddy 
 Sigue Sigue Sputnik
 Skeleton Key (additional junk percussion, consisting of various pieces of metal items and scrap).
 Slipknot (one drum kit, two percussion setups which include beer kegs)
Sons of Kemet
 Steely Dan (on 1974 tour)
 Swans (on Filth and reunion albums)
 T. Rex (two drummers plus percussionist on Spring 1974 tour, otherwise one drummer plus percussionist 1971–1974)
 Soulwax (three drummers used on From Deewee and 2017 tour)
 Taraf de Haïdouks (a Romanian band)
 Tedeschi Trucks Band
 tfvsjs
 Tortoise (on some but not all recordings and performances)
 Ulver
 Umphrey's McGee
 Upsilon Acrux
 U.S. Christmas
 The Ventures
 Vinegar Joe
 The Warlocks
 White Rabbits
 Wizzard
 Year of No Light
 Yes (during their 1991–1992 Union Tour)
 Zaïko Langa Langa (1985–1992)
 ZARD (Izumi Sakai)

References

External links 
"25 Great Double-Drumming Tracks", ModernDrummer.com. Accessed December 31, 2014.

Drumming
Musical techniques